TESD may refer to:
 Tredyffrin/Easttown School District
 4,5:9,10-diseco-3-hydroxy-5,9,17-trioxoandrosta-1(10),2-diene-4-oate hydrolase, an enzyme
 Tell 'Em Steve-Dave!, a podcast